Demetrice King (born January 21, 1985) is an American former professional boxer who competed from 2003 to 2011. He holds a notable win over future world heavyweight champion Bermane Stiverne.

Professional career
King made his professional debut on September 20, 2003, defeating Matthew Fendley via first-round technical knockout (TKO) in Kalamazoo, Michigan. He then had two wins (both by KO) and two losses (both by points decision) before defeating Joe Johnson at the International Convention Center in Sarasota. Next he lost via points decision to Zuri Lawrence at the id-Hudson Civic Center in Poughkeepsie.

After the bout with Lawrence, he defeated Mujaheed Moore (via KO) and Kevin Montiy, suffered a points decision loss to Terry Smith, and knocked out Val Smith at the State Fairgrounds in Detroit on February 18, 2005.

Next, King fought then IBU heavyweight champion and future WBO heavyweight champion Shannon Briggs at Madison Square Garden in New York on March 3, 2005. He lost the fight via TKO in the second round. Briggs was the first boxer to stop King.

After the bout with Briggs, King suffered a number of defeats, at the hands of boxers including Jason Estrada, Chazz Witherspoon, Derric Rossy, and Kevin Johnson, losing via points decision each time.

Following his loss to Kevin Johnson, King had a winning streak of five, all by knockout, defeating, among others, future WBC heavyweight champion Bermane Stiverne in 2007. This winning streak brought his record to 14–15.

He next suffered a points decision loss to Michael Grant in National Guard Armory in Philadelphia, and on August 29, 2008, he lost a rematch with Raymond Olubowale (whom he had defeated via KO in October of the previous year), also via points decision.

He defeated the then undefeated Australian prospect Bowie Tupou via KO in the second round in their bout at Agua Caliente Casino in Rancho Mirage.

By November 2009, King was ranked the 40th heavyweight in the world, and the 18th in the United States.

After his win over Tupou, he was set to fight Fres Oquendo for the NABA and vacant USBA heavyweight titles. The 12-round fight took place at the Horseshoe Casino in Hammond on February 20, 2010. King failed to answer the bell for the tenth round.

His last two fights were against Tor Hamer and David Tua, losing both via points decision.

King was knocked out only once in his career, by Shannon Briggs in their Madison Square Garden bout. He has stated that some of his points decision losses were "very controversial".

Professional boxing record

References

External links
 

1985 births
Living people
Heavyweight boxers
Boxers from Michigan
American male boxers
Sportspeople from Jackson, Michigan
African-American boxers
20th-century African-American people